Steve Oluseyi Ayorinde  (born 1970) is the immediate past Commissioner for Tourism, Arts and Culture in Lagos State in Nigeria. Before that, he was the Lagos State Commissioner for Information and Strategy, sworn in by His Excellency the Governor of Lagos State Akinwunmi Ambode on 19 October 2015. He was also previously the Managing Director/Editor-In-Chief of the National Mirror newspaper, and before that, the Editor of The Punch newspaper in Nigeria.

He is also regarded as one of Nigeria's best renowned film and art critics, who has served on the Juries for some of the world's most recognised film festivals and awards, such as the Toronto International Film Festival, Cannes Film Festival, Berlin International Film Festival, AMAA and Mumbai International Film Festival.

Education
A product of Obafemi Awolowo University, Ile-Ife, Steve Ayorinde was also educated at the University of Lagos, Akoka, and University of Leicester in the UK, where he earned a Master's Degree in Globalization and Communications. Well travelled and a polyglot, he is a European Union Fellow at the Foundation Journalists-in-Europe (1997–98), a comprehensive one-year training scheme for mid-career journalists. He is also an alumnus of the State Department’s International Visitors’ program (IVP) in the United States, the Goethe Institute, Berlin, and the University of Siena for Foreigners, Italy.›

Career in journalism
As a Journalist, Author, Publisher, Media Consultant, Ayorinde has more than 24 years experience and has won many awards.

His career started in 1991 at The Guardian Newspapers in Lagos, Nigeria which was renowned as the flagship in Nigerian Media Space at the time. He was a pioneer staff of The Comet where he edited the Arts, Entertainment and Media Section (1999–2003), after which he joined The Punch, Nigeria’s largest circulation newspaper. He worked at The Punch in various capacities, first as Arts Editor, United Kingdom Correspondent, Member of the Editorial Board and ultimately as Editor of the daily title. It was at The Punch where he started his popular back-page column, "Something Before the Weekend", which ran every Thursday. He later worked at the National Mirror, first as the Editor/Executive Director in charge of Publications and later as Managing Director/Editor-in-Chief between 2010 and 2013. He has since practised as a syndicated columnist and Media Consultant and Strategist. He was the Director of Media and Communications to the Akinwunmi Ambode Campaign Organization between September 2014 and April 2015. He is the promoter of first Arts and Culture publication in Nigeria. It's called  The Culture Newspaper (TCN)

Author
Ayorinde is the author of three books: Masterpieces: A Critic’s Timeless Report (Spectrum Books, 2008); Abokede: The Man, The Hill, The City (ArtPillar Books, 2011) and Cascade of Change: A Decade of Liberal Thoughts (Liberal Publishing, 2015). He also edited For Law, For Country: Conversations with the Bar and the Bench (Global Media Mirror Publications, 2012).
 
A committed member of the pen fraternity, Ayorinde has served the Nigerian Guild of Editors in various capacities over the past decade, as Assistant Secretary General; Vice-President (West) and Deputy President.

Personal life
Steve Ayorinde is married to Temitope, with whom he has three children.

References

Living people
Nigerian film critics
Nigerian journalists
1970 births
Obafemi Awolowo University alumni
University of Lagos alumni
Alumni of the University of Leicester
Commissioners of ministries of Lagos State
Yoruba politicians
Yoruba journalists
People from Ibadan